NH 25A may refer to:

 National Highway 25A (India)
 New Hampshire Route 25A, United States